The 58th Annual TV Week Logie Awards were held on Sunday 8 May 2016 at the Crown Palladium in Melbourne, and broadcast live on the Nine Network. Public voting for the Best Award categories began on 16 November 2015, and ended on 17 January 2016. Nominations were announced on 3 April 2016, along with the winners of the Outstanding Newcomer Awards.

It was announced on 4 November 2015, that the 2016 Logie Awards would reinstate the Logie Award for Best Factual Program, as well as a new publicly voted category for Best News Panel or a Current Affairs Program. Two new industry-voted awards were also given, Logie Award for Most Outstanding Supporting Actor and Actress. Additionally, all publicly voted category awards changed their title from "Most Popular" to "Best" awards.

Digital Content 
The 2016 ceremony will also be the first to accept nominations for original Australian content produced by or airing on streaming media such as Netflix, Presto and Stan. Comedy series No Activity, distributed by Stan, earned 3 nominations, thus becoming the first program premiering on a streaming service to earn a Logie nomination.

Winners and nominees
Nominees were announced at an event held in Melbourne on 3 April 2016, hosted by Peter Helliar and Sylvia Jeffreys.

Gold Logie

Acting/Presenting

Best Programs

Most Outstanding Programs

Performers
Delta Goodrem – "Dear Life"
Jimmy Barnes
Conrad Sewell

In Memoriam
The In Memoriam segment was introduced by Jennifer Byrne. Clare Bowditch performed a cover version of The Beatles "In My Life". The following deceased were honoured:

 Jon English, actor and entertainer
 Lois Ramsey, actress
 Lionel Williams, host
 Brian Johns AO, executive
 Robyn Sinclair, writer, executive
 Bob Hornery, actor
 Carol Burns, actress
 Adrian Dellevergin, executive producer, director
 John Pinder, comedy producer
 Yoram Gross AM, creator, producer
 Harry Butler AO CBE, presenter
 Sir James Cruthers AO, pioneer, executive
 Richard Montgomery, location manager
 Lesley Bradford, news unit manager
 Noel Cantrill, sound mixer
 Carolyn Stewart, TV Week journalist
 Bruce Mansfield, presenter
 Bob Ellis, writer
 Don Battye, writer, producer
 Graeme Sutcliffe, director
 Charles Stewart, presenter, producer
 John Crook, host
 Sonia Borg AM, writer
 Adrian Wright, actor
 Peter Hudson, executive
 Geoff Brown, executive
 Sam de Brito, writer
 John Patterson, writer
 Suresh Ayyar, editor
 John Cousins, actor
 Jeff Thomas, floor manager, director
 Phil Booth, director, producer
 Brian Phillis, director
 Gunter Ericoli, sound recordist
 Chris Thomson, director
 Robert Greenberg, writer, producer
 Barbara Jungwirth, actress
 Mike Gibson, host

Controversies during Logies night

The Seven Network's, Sydney-based, news and weather anchor Mark Ferguson and sports anchor Mel McLaughlin, the winners of the Logie for Most Outstanding News Coverage for the Parramatta Shooting, were not present to accept the award personally. 

TV Week had been informed a week earlier that Ferguson and McLaughlin had been prevented from attending the Logie Awards on the rival Nine Network because of their commitments to the Sydney-based 6pm local news bulletin, having to stay at Seven's Martin Place news studios that evening and throughout night, presenting news updates. Seven had offered to work around these logistics if they could be assured that Seven News had won a Logie award. In the interests of maintaining the security of the Logies results, TV Week could not release such information to the news department in advance, even in the strictest confidence. The Logie was instead accepted on stage by their boss Rob Rashke.

References

External links

2016
2016 television awards
2016 in Australian television
2010s in Melbourne
2016 awards in Australia